Edict on the Transfer of the Capital is the edict written by the asking of emperor Lý Thái Tổ and was issued in the fall of 1010 to transfer the capital of Đại Cồ Việt from Hoa Lư to Đại La.

History
In 968, Vietnam was unified by emperor Đinh Bộ Lĩnh, ended the Anarchy of the 12 Warlords period. He placed the imperial capital in the mountainous Hoa Lư, located in modern-day Ninh Bình province of Vietnam, and Hoa Lư stayed being the capital for about 42 years and developed into a major cultural centre of Vietnam.

In 1005, ruling emperor Lê Hoàn of the Early Lê dynasty died, resulting in a succession dispute between the princes, Lê Long Đĩnh, Lê Long Tích, Lê Long Kính and crown prince Lê Long Việt, preventing a government to take control over the entire country for eight months. Eventually, Lê Long Đĩnh won control of the throne, became the new emperor. As a result of the emperor's poor health, according to some sources, most power was actually controlled by one of the members of the Lý family Lý Công Uẩn. Lê Long Đĩnh's reign only lasted for four years and he died in 1009. After Lê Long Đĩnh died, the court agreed to enthrone the high-rank mandarin and aristocrat Lý Công Uẩn as the new emperor under pressure from the public and from the Buddhist monks, thus ending the Early Lê dynasty.

Realising the difficulty of having the capital in a mountainous region, Lý Thái Tổ (Lý Công Uẩn) and the royal court decided to relocate from Hoa Lư to the site of Đại La (modern-day Hanoi) in the next year, 1010. Đại La was known as the city that the Tang general Gao Pian had built in the 860s after the ravages of the Nanzhao War. In 1010, Lý Công Uẩn published the edict explaining why he move his capital to Dai La. Lý Công Uẩn chose the site because it had been an earlier capital in the rich Red River Delta. He saw Đại La as a place "between Heaven and Earth where the coiling dragon and the crouching tiger lie, and his capital would last 10,000 years". When Lý Công Uẩn's boat docked at the new capital, a dragon, symbol of sovereign authority, reportedly soared above his head; he accordingly renamed the place Thăng Long, the "ascending dragon".

Documents
The Edict on the Transfer of the Capital is of great meaning in many respects. The work has been researched in terms of history, politics, literature, geography, philosophy and so on. The edict was first compiled into the book "the Complete Annals of Đại Việt" (Đại Việt sử ký toàn thư) by historian Ngô Sĩ Liên in the 15th century.

Classical Chinese original
昔商家至盤庚五遷。周室迨成王三徙。豈三代之數君徇于己私。妄自遷徙。以其圖大宅中。爲億万世子孫之計。上謹天命。下因民志。苟有便輒改。故國祚延長。風俗富阜。而丁黎二家。乃徇己私。忽天命。罔蹈商周之迹。常安厥邑于茲。致世代弗長。算數短促。百姓耗損。万物失宜。朕甚痛之。不得不徙。

况高王故都大羅城。宅天地區域之中。得龍蟠虎踞之勢。正南北東西之位。便江山向背之宜。其地廣而坦平。厥土高而爽塏。民居蔑昏墊之困。万物極繁阜之丰。遍覽越邦。斯爲勝地。誠四方輻輳之要会。爲万世帝王之上都。

朕欲因此地利以定厥居。卿等如何。

Sino-Vietnamese transliteration
Tích Thương gia chí Bàn Canh ngũ thiên, Châu thất đãi Thành vương tam tỉ. Khởi Tam Đại chi sổ quân tuẫn vu kỷ tư, vọng tự thiên tỉ. Dĩ kỳ đồ đại trạch trung, vi ức vạn thế tử tôn chi kế; thượng cẩn thiên mệnh, hạ nhân dân chí, cẩu hữu tiện triếp cải. Cố quốc tộ diên trường, phong tục phú phụ. Nhi Đinh Lê nhị gia, nãi tuẫn kỷ tư, hốt thiên mệnh, võng đạo Thương Châu chi tích, thường an quyết ấp vu tư, trí thế đại phất trường, toán số đoản xúc, bách tính hao tổn, vạn vật thất nghi. Trẫm thậm thống chi, bất đắc bất tỉ.

Huống Cao vương cố đô Đại La thành, trạch thiên địa khu vực chi trung; đắc long bàn hổ cứ chi thế. Chính Nam Bắc Đông Tây chi vị; tiện giang sơn hướng bối chi nghi. Kỳ địa quảng nhi thản bình, quyết thổ cao nhi sảng khải. Dân cư miệt hôn điếm chi khốn; vạn vật cực phồn phụ chi phong. Biến lãm Việt bang, tư vi thắng địa. Thành tứ phương bức thấu chi yếu hội; vi vạn thế đế vương chi thượng đô.

Trẫm dục nhân thử địa lợi dĩ định quyết cư, khanh đẳng như hà?

Vietnamese translation
Xưa nhà Thương đến đời Bàn Canh năm lần dời đô, nhà Chu đến đời Thành vương ba lần dời đô, há phải các vua thời Tam Đại ; ấy theo ý riêng tự tiện dời đô. Làm như thế cốt để mưu nghiệp lớn, chọn ở chỗ giữa, làm kế cho con cháu muôn vạn đời, trên kính mệnh trời, dưới theo ý dân, nếu có chỗ tiện thì dời đổi, cho nên vận nước lâu dài, phong tục giàu thịnh. Thế mà hai nhà Đinh, nhà Lê lại theo ý riêng, coi thường mệnh trời, không noi theo việc cũ Thương Châu, cứ chịu yên đóng đô nơi đây, đến nỗi thế đại không dài, vận số ngắn ngủi, trăm họ tổn hao, muôn vật không hợp. Trẫm thậm đau lòng, không thể không dời.
In the old times, under Pan Geng of the Shang dynasty, the capital had been transferred for five times; under King Cheng of Zhou, the capital had been transferred for three times. It was not for personal benefits that the kings moved the capital. They did so in order to pursue great causes, choosing the central place, making it favourable for future generations to thrive, that was in respect to the Mandate of Heaven and in accordance with the commons, moving to a place to ensure the eternal existence of the nation and the richness of customs. But now the Đinh and the Lê disregarded the heavenly mandate and did not follow the examples of the Shang and Zhou, just fixing the capital here which causes the shortness of the nation, the people's depletion and the discord of the universe. We are very painful and now thinking of transferring the capital.
Huống hồ thành Đại La là đô cũ của Cao vương, ở giữa khu vực trời đất, được thế rồng chầu hổ phục, chính giữa Nam Bắc Đông Tây, tiện nghi núi sông sau trước. Vùng này mặt đất rộng mà bằng phẳng, thế đất cao mà sáng, dân ở không khổ thấp trũng tối tăm, muôn vật hết sức tươi tốt phồn thịnh. Xem khắp xứ Việt đó là nơi thắng địa, thực là chỗ tụ hội quan yếu của bốn phương, đúng là nơi thượng đô kinh sư mãi muôn đời.
Moreover, Đại La citadel, the former capital of king Gao, is in the very heart of the universe. The position evoketh that of soaring dragon and stalking tiger, in the centre of the four directions, convenient for the development of the nation. This area is large and flat, high and bright, the population are not suffering from floods and darkness, everything is in full prosperity. After investigating all lands of Việt, this place is actually the gathering venue of people from across the nation, the most appropriate place for eternal capital positioning.
Trẫm muốn nhân địa lợi ấy mà định nơi ở, các khanh thấy sao ?
We want to take the most advantage from placing the capital here. What think ye, the court mandarins ?

See also
 Lý dynasty
 Lý Công Uẩn
 Hoa Lư
 Thăng Long

References

 Capital Transferring Edict in ceramic relief

Lý dynasty texts
Chinese-language literature of Vietnam
11th-century documents